Pardosa timidula, is a species of spider of the genus Pardosa. It is native to Pakistan, Sri Lanka and Yemen.

See also
 List of Lycosidae species

References

timidula
Spiders of Asia
Spiders described in 1951